Dalia And The Sailors is an Israeli comedy film directed by Menahem Golan and produced by Mordecai Navon. It was Menachem Golan's second film.

Plot
Dalia (Véronique Vendell) immigrated with her parents as a child from Israel to Canada. As a young woman, she misses Israel and wants to return. She sneaks on board a freighter sailing from to Israel but is soon discovered by the crew who try to hide her from the captain (Shraga Friedman) and the other officers.

Cast
 Véronique Vendell as Dalia Dekelman
 Shraga Friedman as Captain Avraham Rappaport
 Arik Einstein as Hillel "Gurnischt" Goren
 Oded Teomi as Ron
 Gideon Singer as Lieutenant
 Ya'akov Ben-Sira as Chief
 Ori Levy as bos'n, the boatswain
 Shaike Ophir as Jacko, the helmsman
 Hanan Goldblatt as Stanislav Kuchinski, a sailor
 Mordechai Arnon as Toto, a sailor
 Shlomo Vishinski as Srulik, a sailor
 Benny Amdurski as a sailor
 Yehoram Gaon as a sailor
 Israel Gurion as Shmulik, the radio operator
 Reuven Shefer as Fuchs
 Bomba Tzur as Berman, the cook
 Mordechai Ben-Ze'ev as Chiney Chang, the cook's assistant
 Menachem Golan as Italian policeman Vittorio De Sica (uncredited)

Reception
Dalia and the Sailors sold 599,000 tickets, making it the 28th most popular Israeli film in Israeli film history. This is the first Israeli movie ever to feature nudity, although partial and by a foreign actress (Veronique Vendell). Her brief nude scene contributed much to the movie's popularity when it was first released.

Soundtrack
The music for the movie was composed by Itzhak Graziani. Neomi Shemer composed two songs for the films, the title song "Na'arat HaSipun" (The Deck Girl) and "Layla BeHof Achziv" (Night at Achziv Beach) which was performed by Yarkon Bridge Trio and later released on the trio's debut album.

A four-song Extended play was issued for the film. The EP didn't contain two more songs that were performed in the movie, "Layla BeHof Achziv" and "Ktovet Ka'aka" (Tattoo) by Theatre Club Quartet (with Hanan Goldblatt replacing original member Shimon Bar), which was previously released by the quartet in 1958.

Track listing
Side A
 "Na'arat HaSipun" (The Deck Girl) – Band (2:30)
 "Charleston" – Itzhak Graziani (3:00)

Side B
 "Shake" – Yarkon Bridge Trio (2:15)
 "Twist" – Don Julio (2:30)

See also
 Cinema of Israel

References

External links
 Dalia And The Sailors in IMDb
 Dalia And The Sailors in Book of Israeli Cinema site

Films directed by Menahem Golan
Israeli comedy films
1964 comedy films